The Procedure Committee is a select committee of the House of Commons in the Parliament of the United Kingdom. The remit of the committee is to consider the practice and procedure of the House in the conduct of public business. The committee is governed by Standing Order number 147, which sets out its remit, powers, and the number of members.

Membership

58th parliament 
In the 58th parliament, the membership of the committee is the following:

57th parliament 
In the 57th parliament, the members of the committee was the following:

Changes
Occasionally, the House of Commons orders changes to be made in terms of membership of select committees, as proposed by the Committee of Selection. Such changes are shown below.

See also
Parliamentary committees of the United Kingdom

References

External links
Records for this Committee are held at the Parliamentary Archives
Procedure Committee

Select Committees of the British House of Commons